The Basters are an ethnic group in Namibia.

Baster may also refer to:

Baster, a kitchen utensil; see basting (cooking)
Baster (band), French musical group

People with the surname
Job Baster (1711–1775), Dutch physician and naturalist
Marek Baster (born 1976), Polish footballer